Nogometni klub Čarda Martjanci, commonly referred to as NK Čarda or simply Čarda, is a Slovenian football club which plays in the town of Martjanci. The club was established in 1972.

Honours
Slovenian Third League
 Winners: 2002–03

Pomurska League (fourth tier)
 Winners: 2007–08

League history since 1991

References

Association football clubs established in 1972
Football clubs in Slovenia
1972 establishments in Slovenia